The HP 9845C from Hewlett Packard was one of the first desktop computers in 1980 equipped with color screen and light pen for design and illustration work.  It was used to create the color war room graphics in the 1983 movie WarGames.

Features

The attached HP 98770A color display enabled the color graphics with its own CPU and separate power supply, a vector generator based on the AMD2900 bit-slice architecture, graphics memory with three planes of  each, the connection interface to the mainframe consists of a direct data bus attachment, and a light-pen logic.   were available.

The display showed 8 soft keys on the lower end of the screen, 39 alignment controllers behind a door enabled fine tuning of color convergence.

The speed of the builtin BASIC language was accomplished by implementing time critical parts of it in CPU microcode.

A builtin tape cartridge device with a capacity of 217 kB and transfer speed of 1440 bytes/s enabled storage of data.
Average access time for the unit is 6s and a rewind end to end takes 20s.  The directory is stored in r/w memory to enable quick access.

See also 
 HP 9800 series HP desktop computer product line
 HP DC100 - DC100 tape format and drive
 LDS-1 (Line Drawing System-1)

References

External links 
 hpmuseum.net: HP Computer Museum, 98x5 Computers Selection
 archive.org/bohemiae.com: HP 9845B - Summary
 uni-stuttgart.de: 9845B/C CE Handbook (.pdf 2009-08-17)

9845C
Computer-related introductions in 1980
9845C
Computers using bit-slice designs
16-bit computers